This is a list of members of the Australian House of Representatives from 1966 to 1969, as elected at the 1966 federal election.

 At this time, the members for the Northern Territory and Australian Capital Territory could only vote on matters relating to their respective territories.
 The Liberal member for Corio, Hubert Opperman, resigned on 10 June 1967 to accept an appointment as Australia's first High Commissioner to Malta; Labor candidate Gordon Scholes won the resulting by-election on 22 July 1967.
 The Labor member for Capricornia, George Gray, died on 2 August 1967; Labor candidate Doug Everingham won the resulting by-election on 30 September 1967.
 The Prime Minister and Liberal member for Higgins, Harold Holt, was presumed dead on 19 December 1967, after disappearing two days earlier while swimming at Portsea; Liberal candidate John Gorton won the resulting by-election on 24 February 1968.
 The Liberal member for Curtin, Paul Hasluck, resigned on 10 February 1969 to accept an appointment as Governor-General of Australia; Liberal candidate Victor Garland won the resulting by-election on 19 April 1969.
 The Labor member for Bendigo, Noel Beaton, resigned on 9 April 1969; Labor candidate David Kennedy won the resulting by-election on 7 June 1969.
 The Country Party member for Gwydir, Ian Allan, resigned on 30 April 1969; Country Party candidate Ralph Hunt won the resulting by-election on 7 June 1969.

References

Members of Australian parliaments by term
20th-century Australian politicians